Songbun, formally chulsin-songbun (from Sino-Korean 出身, "origin" and 成分, "constituent"), is the system of ascribed status used in North Korea. Based on the political, social, and economic background of one's direct ancestors as well as the behavior of their relatives, songbun is used to classify North Korean citizens into three primary castes, core, wavering and hostile, in addition to approximately fifty sub-classifications, and determine whether an individual is trusted with responsibilities, is given opportunities within North Korea, or even receives adequate food. Songbun affects access to educational and employment opportunities and it particularly determines whether a person is eligible to join North Korea's ruling party, the Workers' Party of Korea.

History
The Korean Workers' Party Politburo passed a decree in 1957 entitled "On the Transformation of the Struggle with Counterrevolutionary Elements into an All-People All-Party Movement", which established the policy and programs for conducting its first large-scale purges of North Korean society. The May 30th Resolution and the KWP's Intensive Guidance Project provided the basis for songbun's socio-political classification of the entire North Korean population by dividing the entire citizenry into three distinct loyalty groups based on family background: "friendly", "neutral", and "enemy" forces.

Description

There are three main classifications and about 50 sub-classifications. Those with a landlord, merchant, lawyer, or Christian minister in their background are given very low status. The highest status is accorded to those descended from participants in the resistance against Japanese occupation during and before World War II and to those who were factory workers, laborers, or peasants as of 1950. B. R. Myers, associate professor of international studies at Dongseo University in Busan, South Korea, summarizes the core class as consisting of "high-ranking party cadres and their families". The wavering class is reserved for average North Koreans, whereas the "hostile" class is made of possible subversive elements (e.g. former landowners).  According to CIA analyst Helen-Louise Hunter, the Communists were highly successful in turning the pre-revolutionary social structure upside down, and songbun is reflective of that. In her view, the "preferred class" consists of 30% of the population, the "ordinary people" make up the middle 40%, and "undesirables" make up the bottom 30%.

Files are maintained on every North Korean by security officials and party cadres from age 17 and updated every two years. In general, songbun is difficult to improve, but it can be downgraded for a variety of reasons such as a lack of political enthusiasm, marrying someone of lower standing, or being convicted—or having a family member convicted—of a crime, political or otherwise. Before the late 1960s, it was possible to conceal that a relative had bad songbun; however, the ancestry of all citizens was thoroughly checked starting with a 1966 census. These investigations have been suggested to have been a response to the Chinese Cultural Revolution which began in 1966. Kim Il-sung, afraid that Beijing would also interfere in his country, whether by invading or sponsoring a coup d'état (Chinese soldiers had been sent previously on "provocative incursions" into Korea), aimed to increase internal security by classifying his citizens. These investigations were repeated several times in subsequent years, for reasons varying from suspected corruption in previous checks to weeding out possible opposition.

U.S. journalist Barbara Demick describes this "class structure" as an updating of the hereditary "caste system", combining Confucianism and Stalinism. She claims that a bad family background is called "tainted blood", and that by law this "tainted blood" lasts for three generations. She asserts, however, that North Koreans are not told of their classification, and that children can grow up without knowing about their family status. Similarly, analyst Helen-Louise Hunter describes songbun as "class background" and says that it is not officially published or precisely defined.

The North Korean government, on the contrary, proclaims that all citizens are equal and denies any discrimination based on family background.

Importance

Since the collapse of the Eastern Bloc in the late 1980s and early 1990s, the importance of songbun has decreased. Before the collapse, the North Korean economy was heavily subsidized by the bloc. Through these funds, the government was able to provide all material goods, so income could only be derived by working in industry or the bureaucracy. As a result, one's ability to obtain goods from the distribution system, where one could live, what career was pursued, or how much one could advance in society depended solely on their songbun, which made it the "single-most important factor that determined the life of a North Korean". Before the centralized system's collapse—which led to famine—the government had "near-complete control of an individual's life"; therefore, the only way to increase one's status or affluence was by advancing through the bureaucracy.

During the 1994 to 1998 North Korean famine itself—when up to 2.5 million died—the songbun system "often determined who ate and who starved", according to Brian Hook.

As the centralized system collapsed, the importance of songbun decreased. To survive, capitalism was "rediscovered", and the average North Korean now derives most of his or her income through private enterprise. When these private markets started, it was instead more advantageous to be part of the hostile class, because they were not as dependent on the government as were those with better songbun. Military service has decreased in popularity; previously, after seven to ten years of service, a North Korean man could hope to become a low-level bureaucrat, but nowadays it is more profitable to engage in private enterprise. Songbun remains important to members of the government elite, but for the majority of North Koreans, wealth has become more important than songbun when defining one's place in society.

A prominent example of songbun involves Ko Yong-hui, the mother of present leader Kim Jong-un. Ko was born in Osaka, Japan, which would make her part of the hostile class because of her Korean-Japanese heritage; furthermore, her grandfather worked in a sewing factory for the Imperial Japanese Army. 
Before an internal propaganda film was released, after the ascension of Kim Jong-un, there were three attempts made to idolize Ko, in a style similar to that associated with Kang Pan-sŏk, mother of Kim Il-sung, and Kim Jong-suk, mother of Kim Jong-il and the first wife of Kim Il-sung. These previous attempts at idolization had failed, and they were stopped after Kim Jong-il's 2008 stroke. 
The building of a cult of personality around Ko encounters the problem of her bad songbun, as making her identity public would undermine the Kim dynasty's pure bloodline. Ko's real name or other personal details have not been publicly revealed (her origins could be figured out, as she worked with Mansudae Art Troupe in Pyongyang), so she is referred to as "Mother of Korea" or "Great Mother", and the most recent propaganda film called its main character "Lee Eun-mi". The complications of Ko's songbun were such that after Kim Jong-il's death, her personal information, including name, became state secrets. While songbun is usually passed from the father, Ko's background has the "lowest imaginable status qualities" for a North Korean.

See also

Yan'an faction
Caste
Social status
Hukou

References

Citations

Works cited

Further reading
  – Annex E. Discrimination: Division of society into three different groups of allegiance to the regime (p. 23)
  – The Reality of Civil and Political Rights 4. The Right to Equality (p. 219 – 224)- DEAD LINK
  – Discrimination in Education, Jobs, and Health Care
  – Testimony about the North Korean regime's political classification system
  – Songbun, North Korea's social classification system
  – Who are the people in the concentration camps: Persons with bad security ratings (hostile class) and their families- DEAD LINK, RESULTS IN A 404
"Robert Collins: Songbun enters into everything"
"Marcus Noland: Fissures within even the core class"
"Andrew Natsios: Songbun system causes death through malnourishment"
"Songbun: Social Class in a Socialist Paradise" by Sokeel J. Park, Research and Policy Analyst

Social classes
Korean caste system
Korean nobility
1957 in law
1957 in North Korea
1957 in politics
1957 introductions
Anti-Japanese sentiment in North Korea
Crime in North Korea
Education in North Korea
Human rights in North Korea
Society of North Korea
Persecution by atheist states
Persecution of Buddhists
Persecution of Christians
Politics of North Korea
Religious persecution by communists
Social class in Asia
Social status